Trioceros melleri, with the common names Meller's chameleon and giant one-horned chameleon, is the largest species of chameleon from the African mainland (i.e. the largest of the chameleons not native to Madagascar).

Etymology
Meller's chameleon gets its common name and specific name from a "Dr. Meller" who is mentioned by biologist and taxon authority John Gray in the section about the habitat of the species in his 1865 description. The "Dr. Meller" to whom Gray dedicated this species was botanist Charles James Meller (1836-1869) who worked in the area that is now Malawi.

Habitat and geographic range
T. melleri is relatively common in the bushy savannahs and interior mountains of East Africa and may be found in Malawi, northern Mozambique, and Tanzania.

Description

Females are generally smaller than males,  and have less developed dorsal and medial crests.  The head of this species is relatively small in relation to the rest of its body and has a more elongated shape in comparison to other chameleons in its genus.

T. melleri is stout-bodied and has a relatively stubby tail one third the length of its body.  A low, scalloped crest extends from just behind the casque of the head through the proximal half of the tail, and a sharp medial crest runs from the lizard's eyes to the tip of its snout, which bears a single small horn.  This chameleon bears greatly enlarged occipital lobes.  It has heterogeneous scales which vary shape and size to various parts of its body and large, granular scales distributed homogeneously on the trunk and limbs.  There are longitudinal rows of large, granular scales in the chameleon's gular region, one of its most distinctive characteristics.

Spots and broad vertical bands on the chameleon's flanks range in color from brown, dark green, yellow or even black.  The basic coloration of the creature is a deep forest green with white stripes, but like many chameleons it can change its color depending on various circumstances.  If being fed or handled they might display black and white dots.  When basking in the sun, the side of their body towards the sunlight can turn dark green or black, while the rest of the animal stays much lighter.

Meller's chameleon has color patterns associated with stress.  Mild excitement or stress is indicated by dark spotting overlaying the reptile's normal color.  These dark green spots turn to black mottling as the chameleon gets more upset.  Severe stress turns the chameleon first charcoal gray, followed by pure white adorned with yellow stripes.  A sick Meller's chameleon may be mottled with brown, gray, pink, or white.  A gravid animal is black, cream, and gray colored and will be bulging with eggs.

With great care, T. melleri is one of the few species that can be housed in groups. This doesn't always work as some individuals will not get along. Constant observation is required to ensure the animals' safety.

Diet and reproduction
Like most chameleons, Meller's are strict carnivores eating insects, smaller lizards, spiders, crickets, worms, and caterpillars. Large specimens have been known to eat small birds.

Females annually produce a single clutch of up to 80 eggs. Afterwards, they accept house flies and larger insect prey including crickets, locusts, silkworms, and cockroaches. They may live as long as twelve years.

Captivity
T. melleri specimens vary from timid to moderately aggressive towards humans, with some specimens being reported as friendly.  Wild caught specimens of T. melleri have fared poorly in captivity, often imported with heavy parasite loads, they have a high mortality rate.  The species has been successfully bred in captivity as long as specific requirements are met and are recommended for advanced hobbyists.

As they are large lizards, a large enclosure is recommended.

High day time temperatures (80-85 °F or 27-29 °C) are needed for the reptile's enclosure.  Simulating the natural temperature changes of the creature's native environment, a night time temperature of the low 60s Fahrenheit (~16 °C) is recommended as well.  They need considerable hydration and various dietary supplements are recommended.

References

External links
ITIS Standard Report Chamaeleo melleri

Further reading
Boulenger GA (1887). Catalogue of the Lizards in the British Museum (Natural History). Second Edition. Volume III. ... Chamæleontidæ. London: Trustees of the British Museum (Natural History). (Taylor and Francis, printers). xii + 575 pp. + Plates I-XL. ("Chamæleon melleri ", new combination, p. 472).
Nečas P (2004). Chameleons: Nature's Hidden Jewels. Second Revised and Updated Edition. Frankfurt am Main: Edition Chimaira/Serpent's Tale. 381 pp. .
Tilbury CR, Tolley KA (2009). "A re-appraisal of the systematics of the African genus Chamaeleo (Reptilia: Chamaeleonidae)". Zootaxa 2079: 57-68.

Trioceros
Lizards of Africa
Reptiles of Malawi
Reptiles of Mozambique
Reptiles of Tanzania
Reptiles described in 1865
Taxa named by John Edward Gray